Windsor and Eton are twin towns, in the English county of Berkshire, separated by the River Thames and joined by Windsor Bridge. The towns are sometimes treated as one (for example in the naming of the local railway stations), and sometimes as separate entities.

For more information see the separate articles:

 Windsor
 Eton

See also
 Windsor & Eton Central railway station
 Windsor & Eton Riverside railway station
 Windsor & Eton F.C.